Truman Enos (January 8, 1777 – April 15, 1858) was an American politician from New York.

Life
He lived in Westmoreland, Oneida County, New York.

He was a member of the New York State Senate (5th D.) from 1827 to 1830, sitting in the 50th, 51st, 52nd and 53rd New York State Legislatures.

He was buried at the Westmoreland Union (New) Cemetery.

Sources
The New York Civil List compiled by Franklin Benjamin Hough (pages 127f and 140; Weed, Parsons and Co., 1858)

External links

1777 births
1858 deaths
People from Westmoreland, New York
New York (state) state senators
New York (state) Democratic-Republicans